The PEN/Jacqueline Bograd Weld Award is awarded by the PEN America (formerly PEN American Center) to honor a "distinguished biography possessing notable literary merit which has been published in the United States during the previous calendar year." The award carries a $5,000 prize.

The award was established by Rodman L. Drake. Previous judges include Brad Gooch, Benjamin Taylor, and Amanda Vaill.

The award is one of many PEN awards sponsored by International PEN affiliates in over 145 PEN centers around the world. The PEN American Center awards have been characterized as being among the "major" American literary prizes.

Award winners

References

External links
PEN America
PEN/Jacqueline Bograd Weld Award

PEN America awards
Awards established in 2008
2008 establishments in the United States
Biography awards